In baseball, an assist (denoted by A) is a defensive statistic, baseball being one of the few sports in which the defensive team controls the ball. An assist is credited to every defensive player who fields or touches the ball (after it has been hit by the batter) prior to the recording of a putout, even if the contact was unintentional. For example, if a ball strikes a player's leg and bounces off him to another fielder, who tags the baserunner, the first player is credited with an assist. A fielder can receive a maximum of one assist per out recorded. An assist is also credited if a putout would have occurred, had another fielder not committed an error. For example, a shortstop might field a ground ball cleanly, but the first baseman might drop his throw. In this case, an error would be charged to the first baseman, and the shortstop would be credited with an assist. Unlike putouts, exactly one of which is awarded for every defensive out, an out can result in no assists being credited (as in strikeouts, fly outs and line drives), or in assists being credited to multiple players (as in relay throws and rundown plays). An outfielder (OF) is a person playing in one of the three defensive positions in baseball farthest from the batter, who are identified as the left fielder (LF), the center fielder (CF), and the right fielder (RF). An outfielder's duty is to try to catch long fly balls before they hit the ground, or to quickly catch or retrieve and return to the infield any other balls entering the outfield. Outfielders normally play behind the six other members of the defense who play in or near the infield; unlike catchers and most infielders (excepting first basemen), who are virtually exclusively right-handed, outfielders can be either right- or left-handed. In the scoring system used to record defensive plays, the outfielders are assigned the numbers 7 (left field), 8 (center field) and 9 (right field).

Outfielders are most commonly credited with an assist when they throw the ball to an infielder who tags a runner attempting to advance on the basepaths, even on a caught fly ball that results in an out (see tag up); of special importance are throws to the catcher if the runner is trying to reach home plate to score a run, perhaps on a sacrifice fly. Outfielders will often record assists by throwing out runners who try to advance farther than the batter, such as going from first to third base on a single, or batter/runners who try to stretch a hit into a longer one. Outfielders also earn assists on relay throws to infielders after particularly deep fly balls, by throwing to a base to record an out on an appeal play, or in situations where they might deflect a fly ball before another defensive player makes the catch; in extraordinary instances, right fielders have occasionally recorded assists by throwing out batters at first base after fielding uncaught line drives that reached them quickly. Outfielders record far fewer assists than other players due to the difficulty of making an accurate throw in time to retire a runner from a great distance; middle infielders routinely record more assists in a single season than outfielders do in their entire careers. Assists are an important statistic for outfielders, giving a greater indication about an outfielder's throwing arm than assists by infielders do. In recent years, some sabermetricians have begun referring to assists by outfielders as baserunner kills.

The list of career leaders is dominated by players from the 1890s through 1920s, including the dead-ball era, due to that period's emphasis on more aggressive baserunning. None of the top 16 players were active after 1934, and only one of the top 50 was active after 1947; none of the top 80 has been active since 1983. Only five of the top 29 single-season totals were recorded after 1894, and only one of the top 157 was recorded after 1936; only four of the top 445 have been recorded since 1963, none of them since 1983. Because game accounts and box scores often did not distinguish between the outfield positions, there has been some difficulty in determining precise defensive statistics prior to 1901; because of this, and because of the similarity in their roles, defensive statistics for the three positions are frequently combined. Tris Speaker is the all-time leader in career assists as an outfielder with 449, nearly 200 more than any player whose career began after 1920; he is the only outfielder with more than 400 career assists. Starling Marte, who had 92 assists through the 2022 season to place him tied for 357th all-time, is the leader among active players.

Key

List

Other Hall of Famers

References

External links

Major League Baseball statistics
Assists as an outfielder